Heroic fantasy is a subgenre of fantasy in which events occur in a world where magic is prevalent and modern technology is nonexistent. The setting may be entirely fictitious in nature or based upon Earth with some additions. Unlike dark fiction, it provides a setting in which "all men are strong, all women beautiful, all life adventurous, and all problems simple". This means that adventures based in heroic fantasy are unlikely to mention any wider problems that cannot be fixed by a quest. Characters within heroic fantasy are likely to be underdogs of humble origin who are placed in situations forcing them to act in a heroic manner, past what is expected of them.

Characteristics

Frequently the protagonist is reluctant to be a champion, and/or is of low or humble origin, and may have royal ancestors or parents but does not know it. Though events are usually beyond their control, they are thrust into positions of great responsibility where their mettle is tested in a number of spiritual and physical challenges. Although it shares many of the basic themes of sword and sorcery, the term "heroic fantasy" is often used to avoid the garish overtones of the former.

"Heroic fantasy" is the name I have given to a subgenre of fantasy, otherwise called the "sword-and-sorcery" story. It is a story of action and adventure laid in a more or less imaginary world, where magic works and where modern science and technology have not yet been discovered. The setting may (as in the Conan stories) be this Earth as it is conceived to have been long ago, or as it will be in the remote future, or it may be another planet or another dimension.

Such a story combines the color and dash of the historical costume romance with the atavistic supernatural thrills of the weird, occult, or ghost story. When well done, it provides the purest fun of fiction of any kind. It is escape fiction wherein one escapes clear out of the real world into one where all men are strong, all women beautiful, all life adventurous, and all problems simple, and nobody even mentions the income tax or the dropout problem or socialized medicine.

— L. Sprague de Camp, introduction to the 1967 Ace edition of Conan (Robert E. Howard), p. 13.

See also
High fantasy
Hero's journey
Heroic Fantasy
Sword and sorcery
Swordsmen and Sorcerers' Guild of America (SAGA)

References

 
Fantasy genres